
Gmina Krempna is a rural gmina (administrative district) in Jasło County, Subcarpathian Voivodeship, in south-eastern Poland, on the Slovak border.

Villages
Gmina Krempna contains the villages and settlements of Ciechania, Grab, Huta Krempska, Huta Polańska, Kotań, Krempna, Myscowa, Ożenna, Polany, Rozstajne, Świątkowa Mała, Świątkowa Wielka, Świerzowa Ruska, Wrzosowa Polana, Wyszowatka and Żydowskie.

Neighbouring gminas
Gmina Krempna is bordered by the gminas of Dukla, Nowy Żmigród, Osiek Jasielski and Sękowa. It also borders Slovakia.

References
Polish official population figures 2006

Krempna
Jasło County